The 2004 FA Women's Cup Final was the 34th final of the FA Women's Cup, England's primary cup competition for women's football teams. It was the 11th final to be held under the direct control of the Football Association (FA) and was known as the FA Women's Cup Final in partnership with Nationwide for sponsorship reasons. The final was contested between Arsenal and Charlton Athletic on 4 May 2004.

Match

Summary

Details

References 

Women's FA Cup finals
FA Women's Cup Final, 2004
FA Women's Cup Final, 2004
2004 sports events in London